Ashish Kumar was a renowned film actor and director of Hindi and Bengali films. He is best remembered for his leading roles in Raja Harishchandra (1979), Jai Santoshi Maa (1975) and Jai Dwarkadheesh (1977) and has played the roles of Lord Shiva and Lord Vishnu in several mythological films.

Biography

Early career
Ashish Kumar began his career in Bengali films before making his mark in Hindi films, mainly of the mythological genre.

Golden era
His golden era was during the sixties and seventies. The landmark film Jai Santoshi Maa (1975) was a blockbuster in every sense, emerging as a national craze.

Personal life
Ashish Kumar married Bela Bose, his co-actor in a few films, and has a daughter and a son. He died on 23 November 2013 in Goa, India.

Partial filmography 

1954: Balaygras
1956: Asha - Arup Mukherjee
1958: Sonar Kathi
1960: Ratan Lal Bangali
1960: Gariber Meye
1963: Phool Bane Angaare - Ashish Kumar
1965: Bharat Milap - Rajkumar Bharat
1965: Bahu Beti
1966: Biwi Aur Makan - Shekar
1968: Balram Shri Krishna
1969: Surya Devata
1969: Nateeja - Police Inspector
1971: Sampoorna Devi Darshan - Chandra
1972: Naag Panchami - Rajkumar Lakshmendra
1972: Mahashivratri
1973: Seetaram Radheshyam
1974: Hanuman Vijay - Shri Ram
1975: Jai Santoshi Maa - Birajram / Borjo
1975: Daku Aur Bhagwan
1976: Meera Shyam
1976: Jai Mahalaxmi Maa
1976: Bhagwan Samaye Sansar Mein - Eknath
1977: Solah Shukrawar - Heera / Munna
1977: Jai Dwarkadheesh - Lord Krishna (as Asis Kumar)
1977: Jai Ambe Maa
1977: Gayatri Mahima
1978: Karwa Chouth - Anand
1978: Ganga Sagar
1979: Har Har Gange - Shiv Shankar
1979: Raja Harishchandra - Raja Harishchandra
1980: Badrinath Dham
1983: Navaratri
1983: Sant Ravidas Ki Amar Kahani - (final film role)

References

External links
 

Indian male film actors
Male actors in Hindi cinema
20th-century Indian male actors
Bengali male actors
Male actors from Kolkata
2013 deaths